Allison Koenecke is an American computer scientist and an assistant professor in the Department of Information Science at Cornell University. Her research considers computational social science and algorithmic fairness. In 2022, Koenecke was named one of the Forbes 30 Under 30 in Science.

Early life and education 
As a high school student, Koenecke took part in a mathematics competition at Massachusetts Institute of Technology. She was in the first cohort of participants for the Math Prize for Girls, and has continued to support the program as her career has progressed. Koenecke was an undergraduate student at Massachusetts Institute of Technology, where she majored in mathematics with a minor in economics. She worked in economic consultancy for several years before realizing she wanted to do something that benefitted society.

Koenecke was a doctoral researcher in the Institute for Computational and Mathematical Engineering at Stanford University. Koenecke was advised by notable economist Susan Athey and her doctoral research focused on fairness in algorithmic systems. Prior to Cornell, Koenecke was a postdoctoral researcher at Microsoft Research, New England, where she focused on machine learning and statistics. Her current research interest also includes causal inference in public health.

Research and career 
Koenecke moved to Cornell University as an assistant professor in 2022. She studies algorithmic fairness, including racial disparities in voice recognition systems. She noticed that voice recognition was being increasingly used in society, and was aware of the work of Joy Buolamwini and Timnit Gebru on facial recognition. Koenecke started to perform tests on the voice recognition software developed by Amazon, IBM, Google, Microsoft and Apple. She showed these voice recognition systems had considerable racial disparities, and were more likely to misinterpret Black speakers. Whilst she could not precisely define the reasons for these racial disparities, she proposed that it was due to acoustic differences (differences in the patterns of stress/intonation) between white and African American vernacular. She argued that this kind of study was critical to improving such systems, emphasizing that equity must be part of the design of future technologies.

Koenecke was named one of the Forbes 30 Under 30 in Science in 2022.

Awards and honors 
 2020 Ben Rolfs Memorial Award
 2020 Berkeley EECS Rising Stars
 2021 Stanford School of Engineering Justice, Equity, Diversity, and Inclusion (JEDI) Appreciation
 2022 Forbes 30 Under 30

Selected publications

References 

Living people
Year of birth missing (living people)
American computer scientists
Massachusetts Institute of Technology alumni
Stanford University alumni
Cornell University faculty
American women scientists